Buranovo is a rural locality (a selo) in Buranovsky Selsoviet of Kalmansky District, Altai Krai, Russia. The population was 1039 as of 2016. There are 9 streets.

Geography 
Buranovo is located on the bank of the Ob River, 18 km north of Kalmanka (the district's administrative centre) by road. Kalistratikha is the nearest rural locality.

References 

Rural localities in Kalmansky District